Photovoltaik Global 30 Index is a German stock market index which includes up to 30 companies in the photovoltaics sector. It was introduced on 1 June 2009. The constituting companies and their weightings are reviewed quarterly (March, June, September and December). No company should be represented with more than 10 per cent. The Photovoltaik Global 30 Index is calculated as a performance index as well as a price index.

The index is a top list of international companies with more than 50 percent turnover in solar energy and an average daily stock exchange turnover of more than 1 million US dollar.

Development
The Photovoltaik Global 30 Index is based on Xetra and Reuters. Its composition and weightings (price index) is shown below:

See also
 DAX
 MDAX
 ÖkoDAX
 SDAX
 TecDAX

References

Stock market indices by industry
Global stock market indices
Renewable energy commercialization